The 1984–85 season was the 83rd season in which Dundee competed at a Scottish national level, playing in the Scottish Premier Division. Dundee would finish in 6th place. Dundee would also compete in both the Scottish League Cup and the Scottish Cup, where they would reach the quarter-finals both of the League Cup and Scottish Cup, before being defeated by Heart of Midlothian in the former and by Celtic in the latter.

Scottish Premier Division 

Statistics provided by Dee Archive.

League table

Scottish League Cup 

Statistics provided by Dee Archive.

Scottish Cup 

Statistics provided by Dee Archive.

Player statistics 
Statistics provided by Dee Archive

|}

See also 

 List of Dundee F.C. seasons

References

External links 

 1984–85 Dundee season on Fitbastats

Dundee F.C. seasons
Dundee